When Words Fail is a studio album by Australian recording jazz trio Paul Grabowsky Trio. The album is the second for the trio of Paul Grabowsky (piano), Gary Costello (bass) and Allan Browne (drums).

At the ARIA Music Awards of 1996, the album won ARIA Award for Best Jazz Album; the second time the trio have won this award.

Track listing

Release history

References

1995 albums
ARIA Award-winning albums
Paul Grabowsky Trio albums
Jazz albums by Australian artists